Kaila Charles (born March 23, 1998) is an American professional basketball player for the Seattle Storm of the WNBA. She played college basketball for the University of Maryland, College Park. After a successful college career there, Charles was drafted by the Connecticut Sun with the 23rd overall pick in the 2020 WNBA draft.

Early life

High school 
Charles hails from Glenn Dale, Maryland. For her first three years of high school, she attended Eleanor Roosevelt High School in nearby Greenbelt, where her teams had a combined 72 and 5 record. While at Eleanor Roosevelt, Charles' teams won two Maryland Public Secondary Schools Athletic Association Class AAAA state championships (2014 and 2015). Charles also earned Washington Post All-Metro honors as a sophomore and junior. She transferred her senior year to Riverdale Baptist School in Upper Marlboro, and helped the team to a national championship game. She was a McDonalds and Women's Basketball Coaches Association All-American selection as a senior, and also received All-Metro Player of The Year honors from the Post.

Recruiting 
Charles was ranked as the 25th best player in her national class by ESPN and the Collegiate Girls Report, though the All Star Girls Report had her ranked as high as 21st. She was a highly-sought player as a five-star recruit, and received over 30 scholarship offers, eventually signing with Brenda Frese and the nearby Maryland Terrapins over Tennessee and South Carolina.

College career

Freshman season (2016-17) 
Charles earned a double-double in her first game and saw a large amount of playing time. She was eventually named to the Big Ten All-Freshman Team.

Sophomore season (2017-18) 
As a sophomore, Charles was named a Preseason All-Big Ten team member, as well as a preseason Ann Meyers Drysdale Award watch list member. Charles became the third player in program history to score 600 points as a second year player, and her 17.9 points per game remain the highest-ever for a Maryland sophomore. Charles earned her first Big Ten Player of the Week honors as a sophomore, and finished the season as a First Team All-Big Ten selection.

Junior season (2018-19) 
Charles received Player of the Week in February of this season, and finished the season receiving Associated Press and WBCA Honorable Mention All-American honors, and becoming a Cheryl Miller Award finalist. She was also a unanimous First Team All-Big Ten selection, and appeared on the watchlist for the Wade Trophy.

Senior season (2019-2020) 
Prior to the 2019-20 season, she was named an AP Preseason All-American, as well as the preseason Big Ten Player of the Year. Charles was Big Ten, United States Basketball Writers Association, and ESPNW player of the week for December 30, and would receive Big Ten Player of the Week Honors once again in February. Charles finished her Maryland career by winning the 2020 Big Ten women's basketball tournament, the first time the team had done so since her freshman year, after losing to Ohio State and Iowa in the championship game the two previous years.

Charles became one of six players in program history to be in the program's top ten scorers and rebounders, holding sixth place for both. She also tied Sun teammate Alyssa Thomas' record of career starts (135), as she started every game of her career.

Maryland statistics
Source

WNBA

Connecticut Sun
Charles was drafted by the Connecticut Sun with the 23rd pick in the second round of the 2020 WNBA draft. She appeared in 21 games for the Sun in her rookie year, starting seven. She averaged 5.4 points and 2.6 rebounds over 17.9 minutes per game. Despite being the seventh seed (of eight) in the 2020 WNBA Playoffs, the Sun made it to the semifinals before losing to the Las Vegas Aces in five games. Charles was waived by the Sun on May 5, 2022.

New York Liberty
On May 6, 2022, Charles joined the New York Liberty on a hardship contract.Two days later, she was released from the hardship and did not appear in any games.

Atlanta Dream
On August 12, 2022, Charles signed with the Dream on a hardship contract.

WNBA career statistics

Regular season

|-
| align="left" | 2020
| align="left" | Connecticut
| 21 || 7 || 17.9 || .412 || .367 || .710 || 2.6 || 0.9 || 0.8 || 0.3 || 0.9 || 5.4
|-
| align="left" | 2021
| align="left" | Connecticut
| 30 || 4 || 16.3 || .368 || .303 || .875 || 2.8 || 1.1 || 0.5 || 0.4 || 0.9 || 4.3
|-
| align="left" | 2022
| align="left" | Atlanta
| 1 || 0 || 2.0 || .000 || .000 || .000 || 0.0 || 0.0 || 0.0 || 0.0 || 0.0 || 0.0
|-
| align="left" | Career
| align="left" | 3 years, 2 teams
| 52 || 11 || 16.7 || .387 || .333 || .782 || 2.7 || 1.0 || 0.6 || 0.3 || 0.9 || 4.7

Postseason

|-
| align="left" | 2020
| align="left" | Connecticut
| 7 || 0 || 11.7 || .375 || .182 || 1.000 || 1.7 || 0.4 || 0.1 || 0.1 || 1.3 || 4.0
|-
| align="left" | 2021
| align="left" | Connecticut
| 4 || 1 || 13.3 || .313 || .000 || .000 || 3.0 || 0.8 || 0.3 || 0.3 || 0.3 || 2.5
|-
| align="left" | Career
| align="left" | 2 years, 1 team
| 11 || 1 || 12.3 || .350 || .167 || 1.000 || 2.2 || 0.5 || 0.2 || 0.2 || 0.9 || 3.5

Personal life 
Charles' mother, Ruperta Charles, competed in the 100 meter dash at the 1984 Summer Olympics on behalf of Antigua and Barbuda after attending Howard University. She has three older siblings. Her sister, Afia, was a track athlete at the University of Central Florida and represented Antigua and Barbuda in the 2012 Olympic Games in London. Her brother Akil plays basketball at St. Francis Xavier University in Nova Scotia, Canada.

References

1998 births
Living people
All-American college women's basketball players
American women's basketball players
American people of Antigua and Barbuda descent
Atlanta Dream players
Sportspeople of Antigua and Barbuda descent
Basketball players from Maryland
Connecticut Sun draft picks
Connecticut Sun players
McDonald's High School All-Americans
Maryland Terrapins women's basketball players
People from Prince George's County, Maryland
Shooting guards
Small forwards